Hennie Dijkstra (25 October 1912 – 1 March 1994) was a Dutch footballer. He played in two matches for the Netherlands national football team in 1939.

References

External links
 

1912 births
1994 deaths
Dutch footballers
Netherlands international footballers
People from Zaanstad
Association football goalkeepers